Vincent Bernard Joseph Lesina (1 November 1869 – 14 July 1955) was a journalist and member of the Queensland Legislative Assembly.

Biography
Lesina was born in the goldfields of Araluen, New South Wales, to parents Alexander Lesina, who was of Italian/Swiss origin, and his wife Margaret (née McGrath) and was educated at St Benedict's school and orphanage. By 1883 he accompanied his mother to Auckland, New Zealand, where he worked at a sawmill and as a seaman.

By 1887 he was back in New South Wales working as a newsboy and apprentice signwriter and for the rest of his working career he was a  journalist, working at various newspapers in both New South Wales and Queensland.

On the 27 March 1895 he married Phoebe Eleanor Cullen (died 1949) in Sydney  and together had three sons. He died in Parramatta in 1955 and was buried in Rookwood Cemetery.

Political career
At the 1899 Queensland colonial elections, Lesina, for the Labour Party, defeated the sitting member, John Cross, for the seat of Clermont. He was expelled from the Labour Party in 1909 and retired from politics in 1912.

Described as a 'nervy, restless dark little man of passing good looks', Joe Lesina was a speaker possessed of considerable wit, biting sarcasm and devastating invective, together with a capacity for detailed research and factual inventiveness. He advocated a white Australia policy and even 'white Empire'. He never rose to any prominence in the Labour Party and his only notable contribution to reform was the adaption of the abolition of capital punishment at the Labor-in-Politics Convention in 1910 which was finally enacted in 1922.

He was a stickler for Labour policy and was twice censured by the party in 1904-1906 for his refusal to surrender these principles. His expulsion from the party in 1909 arose over a disagreement with David Bowman on the liquor trade and certain other aspects of nationalization. An "utterly irreconcilable freelance", he was uncontrollable by party discipline.

References

Members of the Queensland Legislative Assembly
1869 births
1955 deaths
People from Auckland
Australian people of Swiss-Italian descent